Hélène Perdrière (born 17 April 1912 in Asnieres-sur-Seine, died 27 August 1992 in Boulogne-Billancourt) was a French stage and film actress.
After earning a first prize for comedy at the National Conservatory of Dramatic Art in 1928, she became the first resident of Comédie-French. She resigned to become the partner of Pierre Fresnay in the boulevard theaters of the time, before returning to the Comédie-French circuit in April 1952, and remaining until its end in December 1973. She then went on to play with the Renaud-Barrault Company until her retirement a year later. At the Comédie-French, she staged several plays of Marivaux. She was also an election interpreter.

Filmography

References

External links
 

1912 births
1992 deaths
French film actresses
People from Asnières-sur-Seine
Sociétaires of the Comédie-Française
French stage actresses
20th-century French actresses